Stubborn Persistent Illusions is the seventh album from Canadian band Do Make Say Think. It was released on 19 May 2017.

Track listing

Personnel

Do Make Say Think
 Ohad Benchetrit – guitar, keyboard, horns
 David Mitchell – drums
 James Payment – drums
 Justin Small – guitar, keyboard
 Charles Spearin – guitar, bass, keyboard, horns

Other musicians
 Julie Penner – violin
 Michael Barth – trumpet
 Leon Kingstone – baritone saxophone
 Adam Marvy – trumpet

Technical
 Myles Spencer — engineer on “War On Torpor”, “Bound", "And Boundless”, and “Her Eyes On The Horizon”
 Marianne Collins — artwork

References

2017 albums
Constellation Records (Canada) albums
Do Make Say Think albums
Juno Award for Instrumental Album of the Year albums